Pixelpost is an open source photoblog application powered by PHP and MySQL, developed for publishing photos on a chronological base. Main features include  multilingual capability, comment function, Exif support, spam filtering, categories, tagging and much more.
There is a great range of templates and addons available to extend the basic features already included.

As with most Content Management Systems, Pixelpost must be uploaded to a webserver in order for it to function. More information can be found on the project's official website Pixelpost.org.

Pixelpost is no longer being developed from September 2009.

External links
 Official Pixelpost Themes & Addons Repository

Blog software
Photo software